Khai Brisco (born November 8, 2000) is an American soccer player who plays for the Washington Huskies.

Career
Brisco was part of the Seattle Sounders FC academy, and appeared for their USL affiliate side Seattle Sounders FC 2 in 2017 and 2018.

References

External links
U.S. Soccer Development Academy bio (Seattle Sounders FC)

2000 births
Living people
American soccer players
Tacoma Defiance players
Association football defenders
Soccer players from Washington (state)
USL Championship players
United States men's youth international soccer players
Washington Huskies men's soccer players
Highline College alumni